Concetta Scaravaglione (July 9, 1900 – September 4, 1975) was an American sculptor. Her parents immigrated from Calabria, Italy, and Concetta was the youngest of nine children. She is known for her monumental figurative sculpture, her work for the Federal Arts Project (FAP), and her teaching career.

Early life 
Scaravaglione, like most artists, had to struggle with finances in order to fund her career. While she was young, her father died, leaving her mother with a small grocery store to manage on her own, and with the help of her children. In public school, her teacher Cecelia Holmand saw her artistic talent and encouraged her to pursue art as a career. Scaravaglione then attended the tuition-free National Academy of Design in NY, up until her sculpture class was cancelled due to the academy not allowing co-ed classes. She then went to work at a lampshade and a perfume factory to save up, until she was awarded a  scholarship to attend the Art Students League. There she studied with John Sloan, A. Stirling Calder, William Zorach and Boardman Robinson. In 1924, she received the Nicholas Roerich scholarship to study at the Masters Institute of Sculpture with Robert Laurent. Scaravaglione then spent the summer of 1928 in Oyster Bay, Long Island because she received the Lewis Comfort Tiffany grant. Later in life she would receive the 1946 grant from the American Academy of Arts and Letters, and the 1947 Prix de Rome award.

Midlife 
Sometime after returning to New York City, from the Tiffany estate, Scaravaglione began her teaching career at New York University. She briefly took a trip to Rome and explored other parts of Europe before returning to the United States and expanding her teaching career by including assignments at Black Mountain College and Sarah Lawrence College. She took another break from teaching, to focus on her artwork. She eventually returned to it in 1952 at Vassar College and formally resigned from teaching, Scaravaglione retired in 1967.

Throughout her teaching career, and subsequent breaks, Scaravaglione's professional art career took off. In 1926, she was elected to be a member of the New York Society of Women Artists and produced a wooden sculpture titled "The Bathers". Her work, "Mother and Child" won the Widener Gold Medal from Pennsylvania Academy of Fine Arts in 1934. In the meantime, she was hired for the Works Progress Administration (WPA) in the Federal Art Projects (FAP). As a part of her association with the WPA and FAP, Concetta Scaravaglione was one of twelve sculptors chosen to receive a commission for the Treasury Section of Painting and Sculpture. Under this commission, Scaravaglione made four works: Railway Mail (1863), an aluminum figure located at the Post Office Department; Agriculture, a limestone relief at the Federal Trade Commission; Woman with Mountain Sheep, a large plaster figure at the Federal Building for the New York World's Fair; and Aborigines, a limestone relief for the Drexel Hill Post Office in Pennsylvania.

In 1937, Scaravaglione joined the Architect, Painters, and Sculptors Collaborative. This group was mostly made up of other Federal Arts Project artists, who were encouraged to create works for public housing, sewage, hospitals, and other public spaces. This same year she became one of the founding members for the Sculptors Guild. The Guild held their own show in 1938 with roughly 39,000 visitors in attendance. Scaravaglione had entered her sculpture Girl with Gazelle in the show, which received recognition in the covers of both Newsweek and Art Digest.

Later life 
In 1947, Scaravaglione won the Prix de Rome award from the American Academy in Rome, which made her the first woman to ever be awarded that honor. This award included transportation to, and residence in the American Academy in Rome, studio space, as well as a $1,250 stipend per year, which she received from 1947 to 1950.

During this time in Rome, Scaravaglione created Icarus. Her inspiration for the piece was the poem "Icaro" by Lauro de Bosis. Icarus was greeted with equally opposing opinions. Critics claimed the piece was too stylized in comparison to her previous works, whereas fans thought of it as a masterpiece. Icarus, first seen in Rome, and then housed at the Tishman Building in New York City.

After returning to the United States in the 1950s, she picked up her teaching career at Vassar College. For a while she continued to sculpt and carve, until her declining health made her transition to other, easier media such as plaster and wax. She died in 1975 after a long bout with cancer.

Selected work 

 Vincent Canade, 1927, Museum of Modern Art, New York, New York
 Railway Mail Carrier, 1936, Ariel Rios Federal Building, Washington District of Columbia
 Americans at Work, Past and Present: Agriculture, 1938, Federal Trade Commission Building, Washington District of Columbia
 Girl with Faun, 1938–1940, William Cullen Bryant High School, Queens, New York
 Bird, 1952-1953 Arizona State University, University Art Museum, Tempe, Arizona
 Angel, 1962, Vassar College, Frances Lehman Loeb Art Center, Poughkeepsie, New York
 Mother and Child, n.d., Virginia Museum of Fine Arts, Richmond Virginia
 Seated Girl, n.d., Pennsylvania Academy of the Fine Arts, Philadelphia, Pennsylvania
 Seated Woman with a Guitar, n.d,  Cincinnati Art Museum, Cincinnati, Ohio
 Standing Female Nude (Sculpture), n.d., Smithsonian American Art Museum, Washington, District of Columbia

Principal exhibitions and shows 

1930 Museum of Modern Art Exhibition

1933 Fairmount Park Art Association Show

1934 Mayor LaGuardia-sponsored First Municipal Art Exhibition

1938 Federal Art Project Outdoor Sculpture Show

1941 Virginia Museum of Art Solo Exhibition

1964 World's Fair, NY

1967 Vassar Art Gallery Show

1972 Kraushaar Galleries, NY

References 

1900 births
1975 deaths
19th-century American sculptors
20th-century American sculptors
American people of Italian descent
Art Students League of New York alumni
Artists from New York City
Black Mountain College faculty
Federal Art Project artists
New York University faculty
Sarah Lawrence College faculty
Sculptors Guild members
Sculptors from New York (state)
Vassar College faculty